Băița is a commune in Hunedoara County, Transylvania, Romania. It is composed of eleven villages: Barbura (Bárbura), Băița, Căinelu de Sus (Felsőkajanel), Crăciunești (Krecsunesd), Fizeș (Füzesd), Hărțăgani (Hercegány), Lunca (Nyavajásfalva), Ormindea (Ormingya), Peștera (Pestyere), Săliște (Szelistye), and Trestia (Tresztia).

The commune is situated in the northern part of the county, at the foot of the Metaliferi Mountains.

It borders the following communes: Crișcior and Bucureșci to the north, Balșa and Certeju de Sus to the east, Șoimuș to the south, and Vălișoara to the west. It is crossed by county road DJ706A, which runs from Șoimuș to Vălișoara.

References

Communes in Hunedoara County
Localities in Transylvania
Mining communities in Romania